A Muskrat Lullaby is a one-act opera by Edward Barnes, based on the book, Mama Don't Allow by Thacher Hurd.  The work was commissioned by the Los Angeles Opera with funding from the Milken Family Foundation, and originally premiered in Los Angeles in 1993.  The work went on to multiple productions by opera companies across the United States, including The Lyric Opera of Kansas City, Opera Columbus, Orlando Opera, Manhattan School of Music, Mercer University, University of Akron, and many more.

Cast:  Miles, a muskrat (tenor)
Bird (soprano)
Spider (mezzo-soprano)
Toad (bass)
Boss Alligator (baritone)
Alligator Gang (children)
Townspeople (children)

Duration:  25 minutes

Orchestration:  Piano, or piano/electric keyboard and percussion

References

External links
Opera America listing for "A Muskrat Lullaby"
"A Muskrat Lullaby" at Family Audience Opera
Opera for Youth Directory at Opera America
Los Angeles Times article on "A Muskrat Lullaby"
Penn State Collegian article on "A Muskrat Lullaby"

Operas
Children's operas
One-act operas
English-language operas
1993 operas